Tarmo Teder (born 18 April 1958 in Kuressaare) is an Estonian writer, poet and critic.

Born on the island of Saaremaa, Teder studied from 1973-76. at the  Tallinn Polytechnic and 1976-78 at Kingissepa, now Kuressaare. He began work in Tartu and Tallinn, as a boiler worker.

From 1994-95. Teder was the culture editor for “Rahva Hääl”("People's Voice") and from 1995-1998 as an editor at "Eesti Päevaleht" (‘’Estonian Daily’’).

Teder is a member of the Estonian Writers Union.

Winner of the Friedebert Tuglas Award for his short story Viimase idealisti pildid (‘’Pictures of the Last Idealist’’, published in ‘’Looming’’ no 6 2004).

Works
Onanistid (‘’The Onanists’’) (novel) 
Published by Tuum, 2006. pp. 223

Pööningujutud (‘’Stories from the Attic’’) (short stories) 
Published by Eesti Keele Sihtasutus, 2002. pp. 256

Kurat kargas pähe (‘’Bedevilled’’) (novel) 
Published by Eesti Raamat, 1995. pp. 180

Tumedad jutud (‘’Dark Stories’’) (short stories) 
Published by Eesti Raamat, 1990. pp. 192

Luurejutud (‘’Spy Stories’’) (short stories) 
Published by Eesti Keele Sihtasutus, 2004. pp. 184

Jutte kambrist 27-1 (‘’Stories from the Chamber 27-1’’) (short stories) 
Published by Varrak, 2001. pp. 288

Igemest ja abemest (Of Gums and Beards’’) (essays) 
Published by (self-published), 2008.

Angerjapõõsa varjud (Shadows of the Eel Bush'') (poetry) 
Published by FC Boheem, 2001. pp. 70

External links
 Estonian Literature Centre Biography for Tarmo Teder
 Estonian Literature Centre Bibliography for Tarmo Teder
 Estonian Literature Centre ‘’Literary Awards 2004’’
 Fridebert Tuglas Short Story Award
  Estonian Writers’ Union Eesti Kirjanike Liit

1958 births
Living people
People from Kuressaare
Estonian male poets
Estonian male novelists
Estonian male short story writers
21st-century Estonian novelists
21st-century Estonian poets
Estonian National Independence Party politicians